Dowlais Central railway station served the village of Dowlais, Glamorgan, Wales, from 1869 to 1960 on the Brecon and Merthyr Tydfil Junction Railway.

History 
The station opened as Dowlais on 23 June 1869 by the Brecon and Merthyr Tydfil Junction Railway. Its name was changed to Dowlais Central on 1 July 1924. Services were suspended in September 1939 but they resumed in December 1940. It was advertised as a workman's station but still continued to carry passengers. It closed to commercial services on 2 May 1960 and the last unadvertised train called here on 6 May 1960. The site is now a Dowlais Leisure Centre.

References

External links 

Former Brecon and Merthyr Tydfil Junction Railway stations
Railway stations in Great Britain opened in 1869
Railway stations in Great Britain closed in 1960
1869 establishments in Wales
1960 disestablishments in Wales